Archerfield is a mixed-use southern suburb in the City of Brisbane, Queensland, Australia.

Geography 
Archerfield is bounded by Oxley Creek to the west and by Beaudesert Road to the east.

Archerfield is a sparsely populated suburb, with most of the land being occupied by Archerfield Airport in the centre and south-west of the suburb. Most of the rest of the suburb is industrial except for two areas of residential use, one in the north of the suburb and one in the east.

History
Archerfield was named after the 14,000-acre Archerfield pastoral station, acquired in 1881 by Michael Durack b 1846 - 1894, an Australian pastoralist and pioneer.

Archerfield Airport originally served as the major airport for Brisbane. The old civil terminal is still in existence on the eastern side of the airfield. During World War II the airfield served as a base for military flying operations in support of the war in the Pacific.

On 8 August 1995 as southern Queensland experienced a severe cold snap, a temperature of 0 degrees was recorded in Archerfield.  On 4 January 2014, the suburb recorded a maximum temperature of 42.4 degrees, just under the record maximum set in 1940.

In the  the population of Archerfield was 510. The median age of the Archerfield population was 37 years of age, the same as the median nationally. 64.5% of people living in Archerfield were born in Australia, slightly less than the national average of 69.8%. The other top responses for country of birth were India 3%, England 2.4%, Philippines 2.2%, New Zealand 2.2%, Fiji 2%. 67.4% of people spoke only English at home; the next most popular languages were 4.2% Vietnamese, 2.2% Samoan, 2% Hindi, 1.8% Gujarati, 1.8% Greek.

Heritage listings

Archerfield has a number of heritage-listed sites, including:
 Beatty Road (in front of Archerfield Airport): God's Acre Cemetery
 98-138 Kerry Road: Archerfield Second World War Igloos Complex

Education
There are no schools in Archerfield. The nearest primary schools are Rocklea State School in neighbouring Rocklea to the north, Coopers Plains State School in neighbouring Coopers Plains to the east, and Acacia Ridge State School in neighbouring Acacia Ridge to the south. The nearest secondary schools are Sunnybank State High School in Sunnybank to the east and Yeronga State High School in Yeronga to the north.

Climate

References

External links

 

 
Suburbs of the City of Brisbane